The Khaama Press News Agency (Pashto: خامه پرس خبری آژانس; Persian: خبرگزاری خامه پرس) is the largest online news service for Afghanistan, established in October 2010 in Kabul, Afghanistan, by Khushnood Nabizada, an Afghan journalist and entrepreneur.

"Khaama" is an ancient Persian word that means "The Pen".

Khaama Press operates in three languages: English, Pashto, and Persian. The Khaama Press News Agency is a private firm that works in the area of reporting news from Afghanistan.

Khaama Press is one of the most popular websites in Afghanistan based on Alexa ranking and Google News. According to a recent demographic report by Google Analytics, 50 percent of its audience come from Afghanistan and the other 50 percent from other parts of the world, including the United States of America, Canada, Europe, Asia, Middle East, South Asia and Australia.

History
In 2009, the Khaama Press news portal was designed by founder Khushnood Nabizada to publish stories about successful Afghan personalities and biographies of well-known figures, including poets and politicians. After initially receiving positive feedback, the site expanded; during 2010 Khaama Press obtained an operating license from the Ministry of Information and Culture of Afghanistan, as an official News Agency in the country.

The founder of Khaama Press decided to invest in and established the press, because:

Audience
The Khaama Press News agency draws busy traffic with readers from Afghanistan, India, United States, Iran and Germany according to Alexa Web and Information Company.  Its website receives more than 50,000 visits daily.

Khaama Press posts get substantial traffic on social media sites, with around 1.73m followers on Facebook and over 434K followers on Twitter as of November 22, 2022.

References

External links 
 

2009 establishments in Afghanistan
 
Afghanistan
Afghanistan
Afghan news websites
Daily newspapers published in Afghanistan
Mass media in Kabul
News agencies based in Afghanistan
News media in Afghanistan
Pashto-language newspapers
Pashto-language websites
Publishing companies established in 2009
Comp